Gruffudd ap Owain Glyndŵr (c. 1375-c. 1412) was the eldest son of Margaret Hanmer and Owain Glyndŵr, who led a major revolt in Wales between 1400 and about 1416.

Early life 

Little is known about any of the children of Owain Glyndŵr. Gruffudd is recorded as being Owain's eldest son and would-be heir to the crown of Wales had his father's rebellion ultimately been successful in creating an independent Wales.

Role in the Rebellion 

He is known to have taken part in a raid in south Wales in 1405, alongside his uncle Tudur ap Gruffudd, and another rebel Captain Rhys Gethin. They were defeated by Prince Henry of Monmouth, later to become King Henry V or possibly John Talbot, 1st Earl of Shrewsbury. The exact place and date of this battle is subject to dispute, but the Annals of Owain Glyndwr call it the Battle of Pwll Melyn, near Usk. The result appears to have been a major Welsh defeat, the capture of Gruffudd ab Owain Glyndŵr, and the deaths of Tudur and Rhys Gethin.

Imprisonment and death
Before being taken to the Tower of London he was first imprisoned at Nottingham. He was sent from there to the Tower of London and after seven years died in prison of bubonic plague.

Family
It is not known if he was married or had sired any children of his own.

Notes

References 

 — This source is republished from 

 — Reference: The House of Mathrafal.pdf relates the entire genealogy of this family to include the histories of Owain Glyndwr's descendants.

Further reading

1370s births
1410s deaths
15th-century deaths from plague (disease)
Year of birth uncertain
Year of death uncertain
Welsh princes
House of Mathrafal
Welsh rebels
Prisoners in the Tower of London
Welsh people who died in prison custody
15th-century Welsh military personnel